Two Thousand Dollas For Coyote (also known as Django cacciatore di taglie) is a 1966 Spaghetti Western directed by León Klimovsky.

Plot
Sam Foster, a bounty hunter, is on the trail of a gang of outlaws who have persuaded a youth, Jimmy, to help them rob the town bank. When the outlaws head for Mexico, Sam has to convince Jimmy to turn against the outlaws and recover the loot.

Cast 
 James Philbrook as Sam Foster
 Nuria Torray as Mary Patterson
 Perla Cristal as Rita
 Vidal Molina as Sonora
 Alfonso Rojas as Sheriff
 Guillermo Méndez as Lester
 Rafael Vaquero as Hombre de Sonora
 Jose L. Lluch as Ricardo
 Antonio Moreno as Jeremy
 Lola Lemos Jeremy's sister
 Rafael F. Rosas as Charlie Foster
 José Sancho as Ayudante del Sheriff
 José Miguel Ariza
 Julio P. Tabernero as Jimmy Patterson
 Aldo Berti
 Rafael Luis Calvo as White Feather
 Jonathan Daly

References

External links

1966 films
Spanish Western (genre) films
Django films
Italian Western (genre) films
1966 Western (genre) films
1960s Italian-language films
1960s Italian films